George Melville, 1st Earl of Melville (163620 May 1707) was a Scottish aristocrat and statesman during the reign of William III and Mary II.

In 1643, he succeeded his father as Lord Melville.

Career
At the Restoration of the Stuarts Melville was a moderate Whig and Presbyterian who whilst serving under the Duke of Monmouth in his suppression of the Covenanters in 1679 had tried to persuade the insurgents (Whig extremists) to lay down their arms peacefully.

Exile
The turning point in his career came in 1683 when Melville and his son David Leslie-Melville, the Earl of Leven, were accused of complicity in the Rye House Plot. a Whig conspiracy to assassinate King Charles II and his brother the Duke of York (the future James VII).
To escape arrest Melville, together with his son, fled to the Netherlands where they joined the band of British Protestant exiles at the court of Prince William of Orange. Here Melville became one of the chief Scots supporters of William of Orange.

Return

After the "Glorious Revolution" of 1688 Melville played a prominent part in Scots and English politics, most notably in the Convention Parliament which offered the crown of Scotland to William of Orange and his wife, Mary, daughter of the deposed James VII. In 1689 William made him sole Secretary of State for Scotland and in 1690 he was created Earl of Melville, Viscount Kirkaldie, and Lord Raith, Monymaill and Balwearie (all in the Peerage of Scotland).

Although Melville's appointment as Keeper of the Privy Seal of Scotland in 1693 was a political demotion he enjoyed substantial emoluments, the more so after 1696 when he became President of the Privy Council of Scotland at an annual salary of £1,000 sterling. He was however deprived of his offices when Anne became queen in 1702.

In fiction
It is possible that details of Melville and his son's lives were used by Sir Walter Scott in this novel Old Mortality to lend authentic sounding biographical detail to the hero Henry Morton.

In the novel Morton – like Melville a moderate Whig who desires peace and religious tolerance whilst supporting the Stuart monarchy – is reluctantly involved in the Covenanter uprising of 1689 (albeit on the Rebel side) and attempts to negotiate a peaceful end to the conflict between his brother Calvinists and the Anglican Royalists.

Later Morton is forced to flee to the Netherlands where (living under his mother's name of Melville) he becomes one of William of Orange's supporters, before returning to Britain in the wake of the Glorious Revolution.

References

An Historical Account of Melville House, John Gifford

1636 births
1707 deaths
Scottish politicians
Earls in the Peerage of Scotland
Scottish Presbyterians
Whig (British political party) politicians
Scottish soldiers
Members of the Privy Council of Scotland
People of the Rye House Plot
17th-century Scottish peers
17th-century Scottish politicians
Lords High Commissioner to the Parliament of Scotland
Members of the Convention of the Estates of Scotland 1689